Sunil Salam (born 1 March 1996) is an Indian cricketer. He made his first-class debut on 12 February 2020, for Manipur in the 2019–20 Ranji Trophy. He made his Twenty20 debut on 9 November 2021, for Manipur in the 2021–22 Syed Mushtaq Ali Trophy.

References

External links
 

1996 births
Living people
Indian cricketers
Manipur cricketers
Place of birth missing (living people)